Albert Luthuli Local Municipality is a South African local municipality situated in the Gert Sibande District Municipality, Grass and Wetlands region, of Mpumalanga. It was named after Albert Luthuli. Carolina is the seat of the municipality.

Main places
The 2001 census divided the municipality into the following main places:

Politics 

The municipal council consists of forty-nine members elected by mixed-member proportional representation. Twenty-five councillors are elected by first-past-the-post voting in twenty-five wards, while the remaining twenty-four are chosen from party lists so that the total number of party representatives is proportional to the number of votes received. In the 2021 South African municipal elections the African National Congress (ANC) won a majority of thirty-nine seats on the council.

The following table shows the results of the election.

References

External links
 Official website

Local municipalities of the Gert Sibande District Municipality